Narayana Rao or Narayanarao may refer to:

Dasari Narayana Rao (1942–2017), Telugu film director and Parliamentarian
G. V. Narayana Rao (born 1953), Telugu film/TV actor, producer
C. H. Narayana Rao Indian film actor (1937–1984), producer
Chitrapu Narayana Rao (1913–1985), Indian film director
Huilgol Narayana Rao (1884–1971), Kannada poet and playwright
Kaloji Narayana Rao (1914–2002), Indian freedom fighter and political activist of Telangana
Karri Narayana Rao (born 1929), Indian parliament member
Narayana Rao (cricketer) (born 1940), cricketer who played for Andhra
T. Narayana Rao (born 1959), Indian laparoscopic surgeon
Uppalapati Narayana Rao (born 1958), Indian film director
Narayana Rao (author), Indian author, critic, researcher, translator